Prabha Rau (4 March 1935 – 26 April 2010) was an Indian politician and  the Governor of Rajasthan state of India when she died. She was appointed Governor of Rajasthan after she was transferred from Governor of Himachal Pradesh after Urmila Singh took charge on 25 Jan 2010 at Shimla. Initially following the death of previous governor of Rajasthan S.K. Singh, she got additional charge as Governor of Rajasthan along with charge of Governor of Himachal Pradesh. She was the governor of Himachal Pradesh since 19 July 2008. She was the former president of Maharashtra Pradesh Congress Committee. She hailed from Wardha. She has a brother named Arun Wasu.

She was Member of Parliament in 13th Lok Sabha and was elected from Wardha (Lok Sabha constituency) in Maharashtra. She was elected to Maharashtra Legislative Assembly in 1972 from Pulgaon for the first time.
 
She was a former athlete and had represented Maharashtra in the long jump, high jump, hurdles, discus throw, and running. She was a musician and held a master's degree in Politics and Music.

Rau died on 26 April 2010 after suffering a heart attack in the Jodhpur house in New Delhi. She became the second Governor of Rajasthan in a row to die in office.

References

India MPs 1999–2004
1935 births
2010 deaths
Governors of Himachal Pradesh
Governors of Rajasthan
Indian National Congress politicians from Maharashtra
Women state governors of India
Marathi politicians
Lok Sabha members from Maharashtra
Maharashtra MLAs 1972–1978
People from Wardha district
Women in Rajasthan politics
Women in Himachal Pradesh politics
20th-century Indian women politicians
20th-century Indian politicians
21st-century Indian women politicians
21st-century Indian politicians
Women members of the Maharashtra Legislative Assembly